The 1969 Australian Rally Championship was a series of five rallying events held across Australia during 1969. It was the second Australian Rally Championship.

Frank Kilfoyle won the Drivers Championship in a Ford Cortina Lotus and his navigator Doug Rutherford won the Navigators Championship. The Ford Motor Company of Australia won the Manufacturers Award.

Season review

The second Australian Rally Championship was decided over five events, staged across the Eastern States of Australia with two events in Victoria and one each in Queensland, New South Wales and South Australia.

The Rallies

The five events of the 1969 season were as follows.

Round Two – Snowy Mountains Rally

Round Three – John Martin 500 Rally

1969 Drivers and Navigators Championships
Final pointscore for 1969 is as follows.

Frank Kilfoyle – Champion Driver 1969

Doug Rutherford – Champion Navigator 1969

Manufacturers Award
The Ford Motor Company of Australia won the Manufacturers Award.

References

External links
  Results of Snowy Mountains Rally and ARC results.

Rally Championship
Rally competitions in Australia
1969 in rallying